This is a list of all United States Supreme Court cases from volume 473 of the United States Reports:

External links

1985 in law